Tina Mulally is an American politician and businesswoman serving as a member of the South Dakota House of Representatives from the 35th district. Elected in 2018, Mulally assumed office in 2019.

Background 
Mullaly is a resident of Rapid City, South Dakota, where she operates a small business. In 2020, Mullaly was selected to serve on the Mental Health of First Responders Task Force. Mulally is a member of the Republican Party.

References 

Living people
Republican Party members of the South Dakota House of Representatives
Politicians from Rapid City, South Dakota
Year of birth missing (living people)
21st-century American politicians
21st-century American women politicians
Women state legislators in South Dakota